Kendell Marvel  is an American country music singer and songwriter. He released his debut solo album, Lowdown & Lonesome in October 2017.

Early life 
Kendell Marvel was born and raised in Southern Illinois. He quickly discovered his talent as a musician when his father would take him to play Honky Tonks starting at 10 years old. He grew up between Galatia and Thompsonville, Illinois, and spent much of his youth traveling around the area playing shows. Marvel decided to relocate to Cheatham County, Tennessee in 1998, to pursue his career as a songwriter in Nashville, Tennessee.

Career 
On his first day in Nashville, Kendell wrote the song "Right Where I Need to Be" which was cut by Gary Allen and peaked at number 5 on Billboard's country music chart.
This initial success really boosted Kendell's career as a writer and allowed him to work with a wide array of acts including, Jake Owen, George Strait and many more. As his career progressed he returned to his roots, feeling that a traditional sound was a more natural fit for his writing and own music style. In 2008 he wrote the title track for Jamey Johnson's Grammy nominated album, That Lonesome Song, which yielded the same name as the song. Kendell has also written over 60 songs with country star, Chris Stapleton including his grammy winning track, "Either Way". In 2017 Marvel started a residency at Nashville's Exit/In, performing monthly shows tagged as "Kendell Marvel's Honky Tonk Experience" playing original songs, and classic country hits, with a different set of special guests each month. Some of the guests that have joined him on this stage include, Cody Jinks, Brothers Osborne, Alison Krauss, Jamey Johnson, Chris Shiflett of the Foo Fighters, Randy Houser, Ashley McBryde and many more.

In 2017, Marvel released his first solo album Lowdown and Lonesome, a 10-track concept album that tells stories of heartbreak and vice, produced by Keith Gattis, featuring songs co-written by acts such as Chris Stapleton and Randy Houser.

Marvel will be releasing his second studio album, Solid Gold Sounds, co-produced by Dan Auerbach and David R. Ferguson, on October 11 of 2019.

Discography
Studio albums
 Lowdown and Lonesome (Big Daddy, 2017)
 Solid Gold Sounds (Easy Eye Sound, 2019)
 Come On Sunshine (self released, 2022)

Songwriting credits

References 

American country singer-songwriters
American country rock singers
People from Illinois
Country musicians from Illinois
Country musicians from Tennessee
Singers from Nashville, Tennessee
Year of birth missing (living people)
Living people
Singer-songwriters from Tennessee
Singer-songwriters from Illinois